Come Out of the Kitchen is a lost 1919 American silent film produced by Famous Players-Lasky and distributed by Paramount Pictures. It was directed by John S. Robertson and starred Marguerite Clark. The film is based on Alice Duer Miller's 1916 Broadway play of the same name that starred Ruth Chatterton.

Parts of the film was shot at Pass Christian, Mississippi.

Plot
As described in a film magazine, Claudia Daingerfield (Clark) is the resourceful daughter of an old and invalid Southern aristocrat Mr. Daingerfield (Stevens). All that remains of his property is a fine old Virginian country house, barely maintained by Claudia, her sister Elizabeth (Kaye), her brothers Paul (Barker) and Charles (Hackett), and their African-American cook Mammy Jackson (Miller), who is still loyal to the household. When father goes North to consult a great physician, there is no money left when news comes that a costly operation must be performed. There is only one way this expense can be met, and that is by accepting an offer by Northerner Burton Crane (O'Brien) for temporary lease and occupation of the fine house for $3,000, though he insists on having only white servants. As a result, the members of the former high-born Southern family take the servant positions, with Claudia as cook, her sister Elizabeth as maid, and her brothers as a butler and general worker. Then ensues a comedy with the family performing domestic service to people less kind and appreciative, with Claudia struggling in an attempt to cook for the entire family until she is forced to call upon the services of Mammy Jackson and keep her out of sight with various devices. Claudia steers through this situation while fascinating the Northerners staying at the house. Burton Crane slowly falls in love with her and seriously thinks of taking her out of the kitchen, thinking she is a wonderful cook. He comes across a miniature of her, but when it disappears he accuses the older brother of stealing it and has him discharged. One by one the members of the family who took positions as servants are discharged until only Claudia remains. After a telegram arrives stating that her father has survived the dangerous operation causes Claudia to falter, and Burton discovers what has been going on. Impressed with her resourcefulness, Burton asks her to become his wife.

Cast
Marguerite Clark as Claudia Daingerfield
Frances Kaye as Elizabeth Daingerfield
Bradley Barker as Paul Daingerfield
Albert Hackett as Charles Daingerfield
George Stevens as Mr. Daingerfield
May Kitson as Mrs. Daingerfield
Eugene O'Brien  as Burton Crane
Fred Esmelton as Solon Tucker
Crauford Kent as Randolf Weeks
Augusta Anderson as Mrs. Faulkner
Rita Spear as Cora Faulkner
Frances Miller as Mammy Jackson
George Washington as Snowball

References

External links

allmovie/synopsis; Come Out of the Kitchen
Still from the production with Eugene O'Brien and Marguerite Clark (University of Washington, Sayre collection)

1919 films
American silent feature films
Lost American films
Films directed by John S. Robertson
American black-and-white films
American films based on plays
Paramount Pictures films
1919 comedy films
Silent American comedy films
1919 lost films
Lost comedy films
1910s American films